The Association of Candidates (Kattusseqatigiit) was a conservative political party in Greenland. The party was founded in late autumn 2005, when the chairman Anthon Frederiksen delivered 1,003 signatures to the Home Rule domestic office.

In the parliamentary elections in 2013, the party won 1.1% of the popular vote and no seats in the Greenlandic parliament. and subsequently dissolved. Its founder Anthon Frederiksen later joined Partii Naleraq.

Election results*

Parliament of Greenland (Inatsiartut)

 Originally entered into the Greenland Parliament as Independents.

Footnotes

External links
Official website

Defunct political parties in Greenland
Conservative parties in Greenland
Political parties established in 2005
2005 establishments in Greenland